This is a list of seasons played by Neftçi Peşəkar Futbol Klubu in USSR, Azerbaijan and European football, from 1937 to the most recent completed season. It details the club's achievements in major competitions, and the top scorers for some season.

Soviet Union (1937–1991) 
Refs:

Azerbaijan (1992–present) 
Refs:

Notes

References

Seasons
Neftçi PFK seasons
Neftçi PFK